Contai Chandramani Brahmo Girls' School is a  girls' higher secondary school in the Contai town of Purba Medinipur, West Bengal, India.  It is a girls Higher Secondary School.

The school follows the course curricula of West Bengal Board of Secondary Education (WBBSE) and West Bengal Council of Higher Secondary Education (WBCHSE) for Standard 10th and 12th Board examinations respectively.

See also
Education in India
List of schools in India
Education in West Bengal

References

External links 

High schools and secondary schools in West Bengal
Girls' schools in West Bengal
Schools in Purba Medinipur district
Educational institutions in India with year of establishment missing